Matt Ammendola (born December 11, 1996) is an American football kicker who is a free agent. He played college football at Oklahoma State. After going undrafted in the 2020 NFL Draft, he played for the Carolina Panthers, New York Jets, Houston Texans, Kansas City Chiefs, and Arizona Cardinals.

High school career
Ammendola was born in Lansdale, Pennsylvania, and attended North Penn High School. He kicked a school-record 56-yard kick. The previous school-record longest field goal was held by Denver Broncos placekicker Brandon McManus. He made 9 field goals in 2015, which is a school-record. He made 7 field goals the year before. Ammendola had 41 kickoffs into the end zone in 2015.

College career
Ammendola averaged 63.1 yards and kicked off 88 times for 41 touchbacks in his freshman year. Oklahoma State led the nation in opponent starting field position thanks to Ammendola's kickoffs. He made his only attempt of his freshman year, which was a 53-yard field goal against Central Michigan.

Ammendola made 23 field goals in his sophomore year, which is the third-highest single season total in Oklahoma State history. Ammendola led the conference and ranked fifth in the FBS with 23 field goals. His 23 made field goals, including his 70 made extra point attempts, also ranked as the seventh-best single-season total for an Oklahoma State player. He also made a career-high three field goals at South Alabama. He also made three field goals against Kansas and Virginia Tech during the Camping World Bowl. He recorded 35 touchbacks on 104 kickoffs and averaging 60.1 yards per kick.

Ammendola ranked fourth in the Big 12, scoring 109 points in his junior year. He made twelve of his first thirteen field goals to start his junior year. He was struggling when he missed five for six field goals, but he overcame his struggle when he made three field goals to finish the season off. He served as a game captain against Texas Tech.

Ammendola tied for third in the Big 12 and tied for first among kickers with 108 points scored in his senior year. Ammendola converted 20 of 26 field goals. His longest field goal was a 49-yard field goal against Iowa State. He made 13 field goals to start the season, and he made his last 5 field goals to end the season. He served as a game captain against TCU.

Professional career

Carolina Panthers
On March 24, 2021, Ammendola signed with the Carolina Panthers. He was released on May 16, 2021.

New York Jets
On July 31, 2021, Ammendola signed with the New York Jets. On December 4, 2021, Ammendola was released after going 13-for-19 on field goals through 11 games. On December 7, 2021, Ammendola was signed to the practice squad. He signed a reserve/future contract with the Jets on January 10, 2022. He was released on March 29, 2022.

Houston Texans
On August 25, 2022, Ammendola signed with the Houston Texans. He was waived two days later.

Kansas City Chiefs
Ammendola was signed to the Kansas City Chiefs practice squad on September 13, 2022. He was then elevated via a standard elevation on September 15, 2022. He reverted back to the practice squad after the game. He was elevated to the active roster for the Chiefs' Week 3 game against the Indianapolis Colts due to an injury to starting kicker Harrison Butker. During the game Ammendola missed a field goal and an extra point. On September 26, 2022, he was released by the team.

Arizona Cardinals
On October 4, 2022, the Arizona Cardinals signed Ammendola to their practice squad. On October 8, 2022, Ammendola was activated from the practice squad after an injury to starting kicker Matt Prater. Ammendola started the following day against the Philadelphia Eagles, going 1-2 on field goal attempts, but missed the game-tying field goal at the end of regulation. He was signed to the active roster on October 12. He was released by the team on October 17.

Green Bay Packers 
On January 3, 2023, Ammendola signed with the Green Bay Packers' practice squad following an injury to Ramiz Ahmed.

References

External links
Green Bay Packers bio

1996 births
Living people
American football placekickers
Carolina Panthers players
Houston Texans players
Green Bay Packers players
New York Jets players
Kansas City Chiefs players
Arizona Cardinals players
Oklahoma State Cowboys football players
People from Lansdale, Pennsylvania
Players of American football from Pennsylvania